Alanje District is a district (distrito) of Chiriquí Province in Panama. The population according to the 2000 census was 15,497. The district covers a total area of 447 km². The capital lies at the city of Alanje.

Administrative divisions
Alanje District is divided administratively into the following corregimientos:

Santiago de Alanje (capital)
Divalá
El Tejar
Guarumal
Palo Grande
Querevalo
Santo Tomás
Canta Gallo
Nuevo México

References

Districts of Panama
Chiriquí Province